The Ruby Lake National Wildlife Refuge is located in southwestern Elko County and northwestern White Pine County in the northeastern section of the state of Nevada in the western United States. Established in 1938, it encompasses  of wetlands in Ruby Valley, just east of the Ruby Mountains and just south of Harrison Pass.

The Refuge is administered by the U.S. Fish and Wildlife Service. A Visitor's Center (located at ) and auto-tour route allow for discreet viewing of waterfowl.

Ruby Marsh 

Ruby Marsh is a wetlands area within the national refuge, which serves as a nesting area for "the greater sandhill crane and trumpeter swan". In 1972, Ruby Marsh, which is located within the Ruby Lake National Wildlife Refuge, was designated as a National Natural Landmark by the National Park Service.

References

External links
 
 Refuge website

Protected areas of Elko County, Nevada
National Wildlife Refuges in Nevada
Protected areas of White Pine County, Nevada
Great Basin National Heritage Area
Wetlands of Nevada
Landforms of White Pine County, Nevada
Landforms of Elko County, Nevada
National Natural Landmarks in Nevada